Zimbabwe, officially the Republic of Zimbabwe, is a landlocked country in Southern Africa, between the Zambezi and Limpopo Rivers, bordered by South Africa to the south, Botswana to the south-west, Zambia to the north, and Mozambique to the east. The capital and largest city is Harare. The second largest city is Bulawayo. A country of roughly 15 million people, Zimbabwe has 16 official languages, with English, Shona, and Ndebele the most common. 
Beginning in the 9th century, during its late Iron Age, the Bantu people (who would become the ethnic Shona) built the city-state of Great Zimbabwe; the city-state became one of the major African trade centres by the 11th century, controlling the gold, ivory and copper trades with the Swahili coast, which were connected to Arab and Indian states. By the mid 15th century, the city-state had been abandoned. From there, the Kingdom of Zimbabwe was established, followed by the Rozvi and Mutapa empires.

The British South Africa Company of Cecil Rhodes demarcated the Rhodesia region in 1890 when they conquered Mashonaland and later in 1893 Matabeleland after a fierce resistance by Matabele people known as the First Matabele War. Company rule ended in 1923 with the establishment of Southern Rhodesia as a self-governing British colony. In 1965, the white minority government unilaterally declared independence as Rhodesia. The state endured international isolation and a 15-year guerrilla war with black nationalist forces; this culminated in a peace agreement that established universal enfranchisement and de jure sovereignty as Zimbabwe in April 1980. Zimbabwe then joined the Commonwealth of Nations, from which it was suspended in 2002 for breaches of international law by its government under Robert Mugabe and from which it withdrew in December 2003.

Mugabe became Prime Minister of Zimbabwe in 1980, when his ZANU–PF party won the general election following the end of white minority rule; he was the President of Zimbabwe from 1987 until his resignation in 2017. Under Mugabe's authoritarian regime, the state security apparatus dominated the country and was responsible for widespread human rights violations. From 2000 to 2009 the economy experienced decline and hyperinflation before rebounding after the use of currencies other than the Zimbabwean dollar was permitted, although growth has since faltered. On 15 November 2017, in the wake of over a year of protests against his government as well as Zimbabwe's rapidly declining economy, Mugabe was placed under house arrest by the country's national army in a coup d'état, and Mugabe resigned six days later. Emmerson Mnangagwa has since served as Zimbabwe's president.

Zimbabwe is a member of the United Nations, the Southern African Development Community, the African Union, and the Common Market for Eastern and Southern Africa.

Etymology 

The name "Zimbabwe" stems from a Shona term for Great Zimbabwe, a medieval city (Masvingo) in the country's south-east whose remains are now a protected site. Two different theories address the origin of the word. Many sources hold that "Zimbabwe" derives from dzimba-dza-mabwe, translated from the Karanga dialect of Shona as "houses of stones" (dzimba = plural of imba, "house"; mabwe = plural of ibwe, "stone"). The Karanga-speaking Shona people live around Great Zimbabwe in the modern-day Masvingo province. Archaeologist Peter Garlake claims that "Zimbabwe" represents a contracted form of dzimba-hwe, which means "venerated houses" in the Zezuru dialect of Shona and usually references chiefs' houses or graves.

Zimbabwe was formerly known as Southern Rhodesia (1898), Rhodesia (1965), and Zimbabwe Rhodesia (1979). The first recorded use of "Zimbabwe" as a term of national reference dates from 1960 as a coinage by the black nationalist Michael Mawema, whose Zimbabwe National Party became the first to officially use the name in 1961. The term "Rhodesia"—derived from the surname of Cecil Rhodes, the primary instigator of British colonisation of the territory during the late 19th century—was perceived by African nationalists as inappropriate because of its colonial origin and connotations.

According to Mawema, black nationalists held a meeting in 1960 to choose an alternative name for the country, proposing names such as "Matshobana" and "Monomotapa" before his suggestion, "Zimbabwe", prevailed. A further alternative, put forward by nationalists in Matabeleland, had been "Matopos", referring to the Matopos Hills to the south of Bulawayo.

It was initially unclear how the chosen term was to be used—a letter written by Mawema in 1961 refers to "Zimbabweland" — but "Zimbabwe" was sufficiently established by 1962 to become the generally preferred term of the black nationalist movement. In a 2001 interview, black nationalist Eddison Zvobgo recalled that Mawema mentioned the name during a political rally, "and it caught hold, and that was that". The black nationalist factions subsequently used the name during the Second Chimurenga campaigns against the Rhodesian government during the Rhodesian Bush War of 1964–1979. Major factions in this camp included the Zimbabwe African National Union (led by Robert Mugabe from 1975), and the Zimbabwe African People's Union (led by Joshua Nkomo from its founding in the early 1960s).

History

Pre-colonial era 

Archaeological records date human settlement of present-day Zimbabwe to at least 500,000 years ago. The earliest known inhabitants were probably San people, who left behind arrowheads and cave paintings. The first Bantu-speaking farmers arrived during the Bantu expansion around 2,000 years ago.

Societies speaking proto-Shona languages first emerged in the middle Limpopo River valley in the 9th century before moving on to the Zimbabwean highlands. The Zimbabwean plateau became the centre of subsequent Shona states, beginning around the 10th century. Around the early 10th century, trade developed with Arab merchants on the Indian Ocean coast, helping to develop the Kingdom of Mapungubwe in the 11th century. This was the precursor to the Shona civilisations that dominated the region during the 13th to 15th centuries, evidenced by ruins at Great Zimbabwe, near Masvingo, and by other smaller sites. The main archaeological site used a unique dry stone architecture. The Kingdom of Mapungubwe was the first in a series of trading states which had developed in Zimbabwe by the time the first European explorers arrived from Portugal. These states traded gold, ivory, and copper for cloth and glass.

By 1220, the Kingdom of Zimbabwe eclipsed Mapungubwe. This Shona state further refined and expanded upon Mapungubwe's stone architecture, which survives to this day at the ruins of the kingdom's capital of Great Zimbabwe. From  1450 to 1760, the Kingdom of Mutapa ruled much of the area of present-day Zimbabwe, plus parts of central Mozambique. It is known by many names including the Mutapa Empire, also known as Mwene Mutapa or Monomotapa as well as "Munhumutapa", and was renowned for its strategic trade routes with the Arabs and Portugal. The Portuguese sought to monopolise this influence and began a series of wars which left the empire in near collapse in the early 17th century.

As a direct response to increased European presence in the interior a new Shona state emerged, known as the Rozwi Empire. Relying on centuries of military, political and religious development, the Rozwi (meaning "destroyers") expelled the Portuguese from the Zimbabwean plateau in 1683 by force of arms. Around 1821 the Zulu general Mzilikazi of the Khumalo clan successfully rebelled against King Shaka and established his own clan, the Ndebele. The Ndebele fought their way northwards into the Transvaal, leaving a trail of destruction in their wake and beginning an era of widespread devastation known as the Mfecane. When Dutch trekboers converged on the Transvaal in 1836, they drove the tribe even further northward, with the assistance of Tswana Barolong warriors and Griqua commandos. By 1838 the Ndebele had conquered the Rozwi Empire, along with the other smaller Shona states, and reduced them to vassaldom.

After losing their remaining South African lands in 1840, Mzilikazi and his tribe permanently settled in the southwest of present-day Zimbabwe in what became known as Matabeleland, establishing Bulawayo as their capital. Mzilikazi then organised his society into a military system with regimental kraals, similar to those of Shaka, which was stable enough to repel further Boer incursions. Mzilikazi died in 1868; following a violent power struggle, his son Lobengula succeeded him.

Colonial era and Rhodesia (1888–1964)

In the 1880s European colonists arrived with Cecil Rhodes's British South Africa Company (chartered in 1889). In 1888 Rhodes obtained a concession for mining rights from King Lobengula of the Ndebele peoples. He presented this concession to persuade the government of the United Kingdom to grant a royal charter to the company over Matabeleland, and its subject states such as Mashonaland as well. Rhodes used this document in 1890 to justify sending the Pioneer Column, a group of Europeans protected by well-armed British South Africa Police (BSAP) through Matabeleland and into Shona territory to establish Fort Salisbury (present-day Harare), and thereby establish company rule over the area. In 1893 and 1894, with the help of their new Maxim guns, the BSAP would go on to defeat the Ndebele in the First Matabele War. Rhodes additionally sought permission to negotiate similar concessions covering all territory between the Limpopo River and Lake Tanganyika, then known as "Zambesia". In accordance with the terms of aforementioned concessions and treaties, mass settlement was encouraged, with the British maintaining control over labour as well as over precious metals and other mineral resources.

In 1895 the BSAC adopted the name "Rhodesia" for the territory, in honour of Rhodes. In 1898 "Southern Rhodesia" became the official name for the region south of the Zambezi, which later adopted the name "Zimbabwe". The region to the north, administered separately, was later termed Northern Rhodesia (present-day Zambia). Shortly after the disastrous Rhodes-sponsored Jameson Raid (December 1895 - January 1896) on the South African Republic, the Ndebele rebelled against white rule, led by their charismatic religious leader, Mlimo. The Second Matabele War of 1896–1897 lasted in Matabeleland until 1896, when Mlimo was assassinated by American scout Frederick Russell Burnham. Shona agitators staged unsuccessful revolts (known as Chimurenga) against company rule during 1896 and 1897. Following these failed insurrections, the Rhodes administration subdued the Ndebele and Shona groups and organised the land with a disproportionate bias favouring Europeans, thus displacing many indigenous peoples.

The United Kingdom annexed Southern Rhodesia on 12 September 1923. Shortly after annexation, on 1 October 1923, the first constitution for the new Colony of Southern Rhodesia came into force. Under the new constitution, Southern Rhodesia became a self-governing British colony, subsequent to a 1922 referendum. Rhodesians of all races served on behalf of the United Kingdom during the two World Wars in the early-20th century. Proportional to the white population, Southern Rhodesia contributed more per capita to both the First and Second World Wars than any other part of the empire, including Britain.

The 1930 Land Apportionment Act restricted black land ownership to certain segments of the country, setting aside large areas solely for the purchase of the white minority. This act, which led to rapidly rising inequality, became the subject of frequent calls for subsequent land reform. In 1953, in the face of African opposition, Britain consolidated the two Rhodesias with Nyasaland (Malawi) in the ill-fated Central African Federation, which Southern Rhodesia essentially dominated. Growing African nationalism and general dissent, particularly in Nyasaland, persuaded Britain to dissolve the union in 1963, forming three separate divisions. While multiracial democracy was finally introduced to Northern Rhodesia and Nyasaland, Southern Rhodesians of European ancestry continued to enjoy minority rule.

Following Zambian independence (effective from October 1964), Ian Smith's Rhodesian Front government in Salisbury dropped the designation "Southern" in 1964 (once Northern Rhodesia had changed its name to Zambia, having the word Southern before the name Rhodesia became unnecessary and the country simply became known as Rhodesia afterwards). Intent on effectively repudiating the recently adopted British policy of "no independence before majority rule", Smith issued a Unilateral Declaration of Independence (UDI) from the United Kingdom on 11 November 1965. This marked the first such course taken by a rebel British colony since the American declaration of 1776, which Smith and others indeed claimed provided a suitable precedent to their own actions.

Declaration of independence and civil war (1965–1980)

The United Kingdom deemed the Rhodesian declaration an act of rebellion but did not re-establish control by force.  The British government petitioned the United Nations for sanctions against Rhodesia pending unsuccessful talks with Smith's administration in 1966 and 1968. In December 1966, the organisation complied, imposing the first mandatory trade embargo on an autonomous state. These sanctions were expanded again in 1968.

A civil war ensued when Joshua Nkomo's Zimbabwe African People's Union (ZAPU) and Robert Mugabe's Zimbabwe African National Union (ZANU), supported actively by communist powers and neighbouring African nations, initiated guerrilla operations against Rhodesia's predominantly white government. ZAPU was supported by the Soviet Union, the Warsaw Pact and associated nations such as Cuba, and adopted a Marxist–Leninist ideology; ZANU meanwhile aligned itself with Maoism and the bloc headed by the People's Republic of China. Smith declared Rhodesia a republic in 1970, following the results of a referendum the previous year, but this went unrecognised internationally. Meanwhile, Rhodesia's internal conflict intensified, eventually forcing him to open negotiations with the militant communists.

In March 1978, Smith reached an accord with three African leaders, led by Bishop Abel Muzorewa, who offered to leave the white population comfortably entrenched in exchange for the establishment of a biracial democracy. As a result of the Internal Settlement, elections were held in April 1979, concluding with the United African National Council (UANC) carrying a majority of parliamentary seats. On 1 June 1979, Muzorewa, the UANC head, became prime minister and the country's name was changed to Zimbabwe Rhodesia. The Internal Settlement left control of the Rhodesian Security Forces, civil service, judiciary, and a third of parliament seats to whites. On 12 June, the United States Senate voted to lift economic pressure on the former Rhodesia.

Following the fifth Commonwealth Heads of Government Meeting, held in Lusaka, Zambia, from 1 to 7 August in 1979, the British government invited Muzorewa, Mugabe, and Nkomo to participate in a constitutional conference at Lancaster House. The purpose of the conference was to discuss and reach an agreement on the terms of an independence constitution, and provide for elections supervised under British authority allowing Zimbabwe Rhodesia to proceed to legal independence. With Lord Carrington, Secretary of State for Foreign and Commonwealth Affairs of the United Kingdom, in the chair, these discussions were mounted from 10 September to 15 December in 1979, producing a total of 47 plenary sessions. On 21 December 1979, delegations from every major interest represented reached the Lancaster House Agreement, effectively ending the guerrilla war.

On 11 December 1979, the Rhodesian House of Assembly voted 90 to nil to revert to British colonial status (the 'aye' votes included Ian Smith). The bill then passed the senate and was assented to by the president. With the arrival of Christopher Soames, the new governor on 12 December 1979, Britain formally took control of Zimbabwe Rhodesia as the Colony of Southern Rhodesia, although on 13 December Soames declared that during his mandate the name Rhodesia and Zimbabwe Rhodesia would continue to be used. Britain lifted sanctions on 12 December and the United Nations on 16 December.

During the elections of February 1980, Mugabe and the ZANU party secured a landslide victory. Prince Charles, as the representative of Britain, formally granted independence to the new nation of Zimbabwe at a ceremony in Harare in April 1980.

Independence era (1980–present)

Zimbabwe's first president after its independence was Canaan Banana in what was originally a mainly ceremonial role as head of state. Mugabe was the country's first prime minister and head of government. In 1980, Samora Machel told Mugabe that Zimbabwe was the "Jewel of Africa" but added: "Don't tarnish it!".

Opposition to what was perceived as a Shona takeover immediately erupted around Matabeleland. The Matabele unrest led to what has become known as Gukurahundi (Shona: 'the early rain which washes away the chaff before the spring rains'). The Fifth Brigade, a North Korean-trained elite unit that reported directly to Mugabe, entered Matabeleland and massacred thousands of civilians accused of supporting "dissidents". Estimates for the number of deaths during the five-year Gukurahundi campaign ranged from 3,750 to 80,000.
 Thousands of others were tortured in military internment camps. The campaign officially ended in 1987 after Nkomo and Mugabe reached a unity agreement that merged their respective parties, creating the Zimbabwe African National Union – Patriotic Front (ZANU–PF). Elections in March 1990 resulted in another victory for Mugabe and the ZANU–PF party, which claimed 117 of the 120 contested seats.

During the 1990s, students, trade unionists, and other workers often demonstrated to express their growing discontent with Mugabe and ZANU–PF party policies. In 1996, civil servants, nurses, and junior doctors went on strike over salary issues. The general health of the population also began to significantly decline; by 1997 an estimated 25% of the population had been infected by HIV in a pandemic that was affecting most of southern Africa.

Land redistribution re-emerged as the main issue for the ZANU–PF government around 1997. Despite the existence of a "willing-buyer-willing-seller" land reform programme since the 1980s, the minority white Zimbabwean population of around 0.6% continued to hold 70% of the country's most fertile agricultural land.

In 2000, the government pressed ahead with its Fast Track Land Reform programme, a policy involving compulsory land acquisition aimed at redistributing land from the minority white population to the majority black population. Confiscations of white farmland, continuous droughts, and a serious drop in external finance and other support led to a sharp decline in agricultural exports, which were traditionally the country's leading export-producing sector. Some 58,000 independent black farmers have since experienced limited success in reviving the gutted cash crop sectors through efforts on a smaller scale.

President Mugabe and the ZANU–PF party leadership found themselves beset by a wide range of international sanctions. In 2002, the nation was suspended from the Commonwealth of Nations due to the reckless farm seizures and blatant election tampering. The following year, Zimbabwean officials voluntarily terminated its Commonwealth membership.  In 2001, the United States enacted the Zimbabwe Democracy and Economic Recovery Act (ZDERA).  It came into effect in 2002 and froze credit to the Zimbabwean government. The bill was sponsored by Bill Frist and co-sponsored by U.S. senators Hillary Clinton, Joe Biden, Russ Feingold, and Jesse Helms. Through ZDERA Section 4C ("Multilateral Financing Restriction"), the Secretary of the Treasury is ordered to direct U.S. Directors at the International Financial Institutions listed in Section 3 "to oppose and vote against-- (1) any extension by the respective institution of any loan, credit, or guarantee to the Government of Zimbabwe; or (2) any cancellation or reduction of indebtedness owed by the Government of Zimbabwe to the United States or any international financial institution."

By 2003, the country's economy had collapsed. It is estimated that up to a quarter of Zimbabwe's 11 million people had fled the country. Three-quarters of the remaining Zimbabweans were living on less than one U.S. dollar a day.

Following elections in 2005, the government initiated "Operation Murambatsvina", an effort to crack down on illegal markets and slums emerging in towns and cities, leaving a substantial section of urban poor homeless. The Zimbabwean government has described the operation as an attempt to provide decent housing to the population, although according to critics such as Amnesty International, authorities have yet to properly substantiate their claims.

On 29 March 2008, Zimbabwe held a presidential election along with a parliamentary election. The results of this election were withheld for two weeks, after which it was generally acknowledged that the Movement for Democratic Change – Tsvangirai (MDC-T) had achieved a majority of one seat in the lower house of parliament.

On 10 July 2008, Russia and China vetoed UN sanctions on Zimbabwe pushed by the United Kingdom and the United States. The United States drafted the file, which would have placed an arms embargo on Mugabe's regime. However, nine of 15 countries on the UN Security Council opposed it, including Vietnam, South Africa and Libya, which argued that Zimbabwe was not a 'threat to international peace and security.'

In late 2008, problems in Zimbabwe reached crisis proportions in the areas of living standards, public health (with a major cholera outbreak in December) and various basic affairs. During this period, NGOs took over from government as a primary provider of food during this period of food insecurity in Zimbabwe.

In September 2008, a power-sharing agreement was reached between Tsvangirai and President Mugabe, permitting the former to hold the office of prime minister. Due to ministerial differences between their respective political parties, the agreement was not fully implemented until 13 February 2009. By December 2010, Mugabe was threatening to completely expropriate remaining privately owned companies in Zimbabwe unless "western sanctions" were lifted.

A 2011 survey by Freedom House suggested that living conditions had improved since the power-sharing agreement. The United Nations Office for the Coordination of Humanitarian Affairs stated in its 2012–2013 planning document that the "humanitarian situation has improved in Zimbabwe since 2009, but conditions remain precarious for many people".

On 17 January 2013, Vice-president John Nkomo died of cancer at St Anne's Hospital, Harare, at the age of 78. A new constitution approved in the Zimbabwean constitutional referendum, 2013 curtails presidential powers.

Mugabe was re-elected president in the July 2013 Zimbabwean general election which The Economist described as "rigged". and the Daily Telegraph as "stolen". The Movement for Democratic Change alleged massive fraud and tried to seek relief through the courts. In a surprising moment of candour at the ZANU–PF congress in December 2014, President Robert Mugabe accidentally let slip that the opposition had in fact won the contentious 2008 polls by an astounding 73%. After winning the election, the Mugabe ZANU–PF government re-instituted one party rule, doubled the civil service and, according to The Economist, embarked on "misrule and dazzling corruption". A 2017 study conducted by the Institute for Security Studies (ISS) concluded that due to the deterioration of government and the economy "the government encourages corruption to make up for its inability to fund its own institutions" with widespread and informal police roadblocks to issue fines to travellers being one manifestation of this.

On 22 October 2015, president Robert Mugabe was awarded the Confucius Peace Prize, a Chinese alternative to the Nobel Peace Prize for his commitment to the nation's political and economic order.

In July 2016 nationwide protests took place regarding the economic collapse in the country, and the finance minister admitted "Right now we literally have nothing."

In November 2017, the army led a coup d'état following the dismissal of Vice-president Emmerson Mnangagwa, placing Mugabe under house arrest. The army denied that their actions constituted a coup.  On 19 November 2017, ZANU–PF sacked Robert Mugabe as party leader and appointed former Vice-president Emmerson Mnangagwa in his place. On 21 November 2017, Mugabe tendered his resignation prior to impeachment proceedings being completed. Although under the Constitution of Zimbabwe Mugabe should be succeeded by Vice-president Phelekezela Mphoko, a supporter of Grace Mugabe, ZANU–PF chief whip Lovemore Matuke stated to the Reuters news agency that Mnangagwa would be appointed as president.

On 30 July 2018 Zimbabwe held its general elections, which were won by the ZANU-PF party led by Mnangagwa. Nelson Chamisa who was leading the main opposition party MDC Alliance contested the election results claiming voter fraud,  and subsequently filed a petition to the Constitution Court of Zimbabwe. The court confirmed Mnangagwa's victory, making him the newly elected president after Mugabe.

In December 2017 the website Zimbabwe News, calculating the cost of the Mugabe era using various statistics, said that at the time of independence in 1980, the country was growing economically at about five per cent a year, and had done so for quite a long time. If this rate of growth had been maintained for the next 37 years, Zimbabwe would have in 2016 a GDP of US$52 billion. Instead it had a formal sector GDP of only US$14 billion, a cost of US$38 billion in lost growth. The population growth in 1980 was among the highest in Africa at about 3.5 per cent per annum, doubling every 21 years. Had this growth been maintained, the population would have been 31 million. Instead, as of 2018, it is about 13 million. The discrepancies were believed to be partly caused by death from starvation and disease, and partly due to decreased fertility. The life expectancy has halved, and deaths from politically motivated violence sponsored by the government exceed 200,000 since 1980. The Mugabe government has directly or indirectly caused the deaths of at least three million Zimbabweans in 37 years. According to World Food Programme, over two million people are facing starvation because of the recent droughts the country is going through. 

In 2018, President Mnangagwa announced that his government would seek to rejoin the Commonwealth, which is as of 2023 conducting a fact-finding mission prior to asking the Secretary-General to issue a recommendation.

On 6 September 2019, former president Robert Mugabe died in Singapore, aged 95.

Geography

Zimbabwe is a landlocked country in southern Africa, lying between latitudes 15° and 23°S, and longitudes 25° and 34°E. It is bordered by South Africa to the south, Botswana to the west and southwest, Zambia to the northwest, and Mozambique to the east and northeast. Its northwest corner is roughly 150 meters from Namibia, nearly forming a four-nation quadripoint. Most of the country is elevated, consisting of a central plateau (high veld) stretching from the southwest northwards with altitudes between 1,000 and 1,600 m. The country's extreme east is mountainous, this area being known as the Eastern Highlands, with Mount Nyangani as the highest point at 2,592 m.

The highlands are known for their natural environment, with tourist destinations such as Nyanga, Troutbeck, Chimanimani, Vumba and Chirinda Forest at Mount Selinda. About 20% of the country consists of low-lying areas, (the low veld) under 900m. Victoria Falls, one of the world's largest and most spectacular waterfalls, is located in the country's extreme northwest and is part of the Zambezi river.

Geology 

Over geological time Zimbabwe has experienced two major post-Gondwana erosion cycles (known as African and post-African), and a very subordinate Plio-Pleistocene cycle.

Climate
Zimbabwe has a subtropical climate with many local variations. The southern areas are known for their heat and aridity, while parts of the central plateau receive frost in winter. The Zambezi valley is known for its extreme heat, and the Eastern Highlands usually experience cool temperatures and the highest rainfall in the country. The country's rainy season generally runs from late October to March, and the hot climate is moderated by increasing altitude. Zimbabwe is faced with recurring droughts. In 2019, at least 55 elephants died because of drought. Severe storms are rare.

Biodiversity

Zimbabwe contains seven terrestrial ecoregions: Kalahari acacia–baikiaea woodlands, Southern Africa bushveld, Southern miombo woodlands, Zambezian Baikiaea woodlands, Zambezian and mopane woodlands, Zambezian halophytics, and Eastern Zimbabwe montane forest-grassland mosaic in the Eastern Highlands.

The country is mostly savanna, although the moist and mountainous Eastern Highlands support areas of tropical evergreen and hardwood forests. Trees found in the Eastern Highlands include teak, mahogany, enormous specimens of strangler fig, forest Newtonia, big leaf, white stinkwood, chirinda stinkwood, knobthorn and many others.

In the low-lying parts of the country fever trees, mopane, combretum and baobabs abound. Much of the country is covered by miombo woodland, dominated by brachystegia species and others. Among the numerous flowers and shrubs are hibiscus, flame lily, snake lily, spider lily, leonotis, cassia, tree wisteria and dombeya. There are around 350 species of mammals that can be found in Zimbabwe. There are also many snakes and lizards, over 500 bird species, and 131 fish species.

Environmental issues
Large parts of Zimbabwe were once covered by forests with abundant wildlife. Deforestation and poaching has reduced the amount of wildlife. Woodland degradation and deforestation caused by population growth, urban expansion and use for fuel are major concerns and have led to erosion which diminishes the amount of fertile soil. Local farmers have been criticised by environmentalists for burning off vegetation to heat their tobacco barns. The country had a 2019 Forest Landscape Integrity Index mean score of 6.31/10, ranking it 81st globally out of 172 countries.

Government 

Zimbabwe is a republic with a presidential system of government. The semi-presidential system was abolished with the adoption of a new constitution after a referendum in 2013. Under the constitutional changes in 2005, an upper chamber, the Senate, was reinstated. The House of Assembly is the lower chamber of Parliament. In 1987 Mugabe revised the constitution, abolishing the ceremonial presidency and the prime ministerial posts to form an executive president—a presidential system. His ZANU-PF party has won every election since independence—in the 1990 election the second-placed party, Edgar Tekere's Zimbabwe Unity Movement (ZUM), obtained 20% of the vote.

Politics 
During the 1995 parliamentary elections most opposition parties, including the ZUM, boycotted the voting, resulting in a near sweep by the ruling party. When the opposition returned to the polls in 2000, they won 57 seats, only five fewer than ZANU-PF. Presidential elections were again held in 2002 amid allegations of vote-rigging, intimidation and fraud. The 2005 Zimbabwe parliamentary elections were held on 31 March, and multiple claims of vote rigging, election fraud and intimidation were made by the Movement for Democratic Change party and Jonathan Moyo, calling for investigations into 32 of the 120 constituencies. Moyo participated in the elections despite the allegations and won a seat as an independent member of Parliament.

In 2005, the MDC split into two factions: the Movement for Democratic Change – Mutambara (MDC-M), led by Arthur Mutambara which contested the elections to the Senate, and the Movement for Democratic Change – Tsvangirai (MDC-T) led by Morgan Tsvangirai which was opposed to contesting the elections, stating that participation in a rigged election is tantamount to endorsing Mugabe's claim that past elections were free and fair. The two MDC camps had their congresses in 2006 with Tsvangirai being elected to lead MDC-T, which became more popular than the other group.

In the 2008 general election, the official results required a run-off between Mugabe and Tsvangirai. The MDC-T challenged these results, claiming widespread election fraud by the Mugabe government. The run-off was scheduled for 27 June 2008. On 22 June, citing the continuing unfairness of the process and refusing to participate in a "violent, illegitimate sham of an election process", Tsvangirai pulled out of the presidential run-off, the election commission held the run-off, and President Mugabe received a landslide majority. The MDC-T did not participate in the Senate elections, while the MDC-M won five seats in the Senate. The MDC-M was weakened by defections from members of parliament and individuals who were disillusioned by their manifesto. On 28 April 2008, Tsvangirai and Mutambara announced at a joint news conference in Johannesburg that the two MDC formations were co-operating, enabling the MDC to have a clear parliamentary majority. Tsvangirai said that Mugabe could not remain president without a parliamentary majority.

In mid-September 2008, after protracted negotiations overseen by the leaders of South Africa and Mozambique, Mugabe and Tsvangirai signed a power-sharing deal in which Mugabe retained control over the army. Donor nations adopted a 'wait-and-see' attitude, wanting to see real change being brought about by this merger before committing themselves to funding rebuilding efforts, which are estimated to take at least five years. On 11 February 2009 Tsvangirai was sworn in as prime minister by Mugabe.

In November 2008, the government of Zimbabwe spent US$7.3 million donated by The Global Fund to Fight AIDS, Tuberculosis and Malaria. A representative of the organisation declined to speculate on how the money was spent, except that it was not for the intended purpose, and the government has failed to honour requests to return the money.

In February 2013, Zimbabwe's election chief, Simpson Mtambanengwe, resigned due to ill health. His resignation came months before the country's constitutional referendum and elections.

The status of Zimbabwe politics has been thrown into question by a coup taking place in November 2017, ending Mugabe's 30 year presidential incumbency. Emmerson Mnangagwa was appointed president following this coup and was officially elected with 50.8% of the vote in the 2018 Zimbabwean general election, avoiding a run-off and making him the third president of Zimbabwe.

The government has received negative comments among its citizen for always shutting down the internet in the past amid protests such as the one planned on the 31st of July. 2020.

Armed forces

The Zimbabwe Defence Forces were set up by unifying three insurrectionist forces – the Zimbabwe African National Liberation Army (ZANLA), the Zimbabwe People's Revolutionary Army (ZIPRA), and the Rhodesian Security Forces (RSF) – after the Second Chimurenga and Zimbabwean independence in 1980. The integration period saw the formation of the Zimbabwe National Army (ZNA) and Air Force of Zimbabwe (AFZ) as separate entities under the command of General Solomon Mujuru and Air Marshal Norman Walsh, who retired in 1982 and was replaced by Air Marshal Azim Daudpota who handed over command to Air Chief Marshal Josiah Tungamirai in 1985. In 2003, General Constantine Chiwenga, was promoted and appointed Commander of the Zimbabwe Defence Forces. Lieutenant General P. V. Sibanda replaced him as Commander of the Army.

The ZNA has an active duty strength of 30,000. The Air Force has about 5,139 standing personnel. The Zimbabwe Republic Police (includes Police Support Unit, Paramilitary Police) is part of the Zimbabwe Defence Forces and numbers 25,000.

Following majority rule in early 1980, British Army trainers oversaw the integration of guerrilla fighters into a battalion structure overlaid on the existing Rhodesian armed forces. For the first year, a system was followed where the top-performing candidate became battalion commander. If he or she was from ZANLA, then his or her second-in-command was the top-performing ZIPRA candidate, and vice versa. This ensured a balance between the two movements in the command structure.

The ZNA was originally formed into four brigades, composed of a total of 28 battalions. The brigade support units were composed almost entirely of specialists of the former Rhodesian Army, while unintegrated battalions of the Rhodesian African Rifles were assigned to the 1st, 3rd and 4th Brigades. The Fifth Brigade was formed in 1981 and disbanded in 1988 after the demonstration of mass brutality and murder during the brigade's occupation of Matabeleland in what became known as Gukurahundi. The brigade had been re-formed by 2006, with its commander, Brigadier General John Mupande praising its "rich history".

Human rights

There are widespread reports of systematic and escalating violations of human rights in Zimbabwe under the Mugabe administration and the dominant ZANU–PF party. According to human rights organisations such as Amnesty International and Human Rights Watch the government of Zimbabwe violates the rights to shelter, food, freedom of movement and residence, freedom of assembly and the protection of the law. In 2009, Gregory Stanton, president of the International Association of Genocide Scholars, stated there was "clear evidence that Mugabe government was guilty of crimes against humanity and that there was sufficient evidence of crimes against humanity to bring Mugabe to trial in front of the International Criminal Court.”

Male homosexuality is illegal in Zimbabwe. Since 1995, the government has carried out campaigns against both homosexual men and women. President Mugabe has blamed gays for many of Zimbabwe's problems and viewed homosexuality as an "un-African" and immoral culture brought by European colonists and practised by only "a few whites" in his country.

Opposition gatherings are frequently the subject of reprisals by the police force, such as the crackdown on an 11 March 2007 MDC rally and several others during the 2008 election campaign. Police actions have been strongly condemned by the UN Secretary-General Ban Ki-moon, the European Union, and the United States. There are also concerns over Fox Southwest media rights and access. The Zimbabwean government is accused of suppressing freedom of the press and freedom of speech. It has been repeatedly accused of using the public broadcaster, the Zimbabwe Broadcasting Corporation, as a propaganda tool. Newspapers critical of the government, such as the Daily News, closed after bombs exploded at their offices and the government refused to renew their licence. BBC News, Sky News, and CNN were banned from filming or reporting from Zimbabwe. In 2009 reporting restrictions on the BBC and CNN were lifted. Sky News continues to report on happenings within Zimbabwe from neighbouring countries like South Africa.

On 24 July 2020, the Office of the United Nations High Commissioner for Human Rights (OHCHR) expressed concerns over allegations suggesting that Zimbabwean authorities may have used the COVID-19 crisis as a pretext to suppress freedom of expression and peaceful assembly on the streets. OHCHR spokesperson Liz Throssell stated that people have a right to protest corruption or anything else. The authorities in Zimbabwe used force to disperse and arrest nurses and health workers, who were peacefully protesting for better salaries and work conditions. The reports suggest that a few members of opposition party and investigative journalists were also arbitrarily arrested and detained for taking part in a protest.

On 5 August 2020, the #ZimbabweanLivesMatter campaign on Twitter drew attention of international celebrities and politicians towards human rights abuses in the country, mounting pressure on Emmerson Mnangagwa's government. The campaign was in response to arrests, abductions and torture of political activists and the incarceration of journalist Hopewell Chin'ono and the Booker Prize author Tsitsi Dangarembga.

Administrative divisions

Zimbabwe has a centralised government and is divided into eight provinces and two cities with provincial status, for administrative purposes. Each province has a provincial capital from where government administration is usually carried out.

The names of most of the provinces were generated from the Mashonaland and Matabeleland divide at the time of colonisation: Mashonaland was the territory occupied first by the British South Africa Company Pioneer Column and Matabeleland the territory conquered during the First Matabele War. This corresponds roughly to the precolonial territory of the Shona people and the Matabele people, although there are significant ethnic minorities in most provinces. Each province is headed by a provincial governor, appointed by the president. The provincial government is run by a provincial administrator, appointed by the Public Service Commission. Other government functions at provincial level are carried out by provincial offices of national government departments.

The provinces are subdivided into 59 districts and 1,200 wards (sometimes referred to as municipalities). Each district is headed by a district administrator, appointed by the Public Service Commission. There is also a Rural District Council, which appoints a chief executive officer. The Rural District Council is composed of elected ward councillors, the district administrator, and one representative of the chiefs (traditional leaders appointed under customary law) in the district. Other government functions at district level are carried out by district offices of national government departments.

At the ward level there is a Ward Development Committee, comprising the elected ward councillor, the kraalheads (traditional leaders subordinate to chiefs) and representatives of Village Development Committees. Wards are subdivided into villages, each of which has an elected Village Development Committee and a headman (traditional leader subordinate to the kraalhead).

Sanctions 
Since the early 2000s, Zimbabwe has been under sanctions imposed by the United States and the European Union that have shaped Zimbabwe's domestic politics as well as the country's relations with the Western nations. In 2002, Zimbabwe held general elections and ahead of that election the EU sent observers, but the election observer team was forced to leave the country. In February 2002 the EU placed targeted or restrictive measures on Zimbabwe. At least 20 government officials were banned from entering Europe, and EU funding was halted. Prior to the elections there was $128 million that was budgeted for the Zimbabwean government from 2002 to 2007, this was cancelled. Nevertheless, the EU only stopped funding the government directly but it continued sending money only through aid agencies and NGOs.

After some years the EU and Zimbabwe resolved some of their disputes and a lot of the EU sanctions were removed. Only Mugabe and his wife remained on the list while other government officials were removed. However, the EU still did not give Zimbabwe money. So, the government channels money through NGOs as it was seen in the 4 March 2019 – 21 March 2019 Cyclone Idai.

The United States also imposed sanctions on Zimbabwe. There are two types of U.S. sanctions on Zimbabwe. The first one is Zimbabwe Democracy and Economic Recovery Act (ZIDERA) and the second one is the Targeted Sanctions Program. ZIDERA made several demands, the first one was that Zimbabwe must respect human rights, second Zimbabwe must stop its interference in the Democratic Republic of the Congo, third Zimbabwe must stop the expropriation of white farms. If none of these demands were met, the U.S. would block the IMF and the World Bank from lending money to Zimbabwe. A new ZIDERA came into effect in 2018 with the motto that, Restore Democracy or there won't be any friendship, there must be free elections, free media and human rights, Zimbabwe must enforce the ruling of the SADC Tribunal. The Targeted Sanctions Program was implemented in 2003, which lists Zimbabwean companies and people who are not allowed to deal with U.S. companies. The sanctions on Zimbabwe have been in place for more than two decades. In March 2021 the U.S. renewed its sanctions on Zimbabwe.

Economy

The main foreign exports of Zimbabwe are minerals, gold, and agriculture. Zimbabwe is the largest trading partner of South Africa on the continent. Taxes and tariffs are high for private enterprises, while state enterprises are strongly subsidised. State regulation is costly to companies; starting or closing a business is slow and expensive. Tourism also plays a key role in the economy but has been failing in recent years. The Zimbabwe Conservation Task Force released a report in June 2007, estimating that 60% of Zimbabwe's wildlife had died since 2000 as a result of poaching and deforestation. The report warns that the loss of life combined with widespread deforestation is potentially disastrous for the tourism industry. The information and communications technology sector has been growing at a fast pace. A report by the mobile internet browser company Opera in 2011 ranked Zimbabwe as Africa's fastest growing market.
Since January 2002, the government has had its lines of credit at international financial institutions frozen, through U.S. legislation called the Zimbabwe Democracy and Economic Recovery Act of 2001 (ZDERA). Section 4C instructs the secretary of the treasury to direct international financial institutions to veto the extension of loans and credit to the Zimbabwean government. According to the United States, these sanctions target only seven specific businesses owned or controlled by government officials and not ordinary citizens.

Zimbabwe maintained positive economic growth throughout the 1980s (5% GDP growth per year) and 1990s (4.3% GDP growth per year). The economy declined from 2000: 5% decline in 2000, 8% in 2001, 12% in 2002 and 18% in 2003. Zimbabwe's involvement from 1998 to 2002 in the war in the Democratic Republic of the Congo drained hundreds of millions of dollars from the economy. From 1999 to 2009, Zimbabwe saw the lowest ever economic growth with an annual GDP decrease of 6.1%. The downward spiral of the economy has been attributed mainly to mismanagement and corruption by the government and the eviction of more than 4,000 white farmers in the controversial land confiscations of 2000. The Zimbabwean government and its supporters attest that it was Western policies to avenge the expulsion of their kin that sabotaged the economy.

By 2005, the purchasing power of the average Zimbabwean had dropped to the same levels in real terms as 1953. In 2005, the government, led by central bank governor Gideon Gono, started making overtures that white farmers could come back. There were 400 to 500 still left in the country, but much of the land that had been confiscated was no longer productive. By 2016, there remained about 300 of the original 4,500 farms owned by white farmers. The farms that left were either too remote or their owners had paid for protection or collaborated with the regime. In January 2007, the government issued long-term leases to some white farmers. At the same time, however, the government also continued to demand that all remaining white farmers, who were given eviction notices earlier, vacate the land or risk being arrested. Mugabe pointed to foreign governments and alleged "sabotage" as the cause of the fall of the Zimbabwean economy, as well as the country's 80% formal unemployment rate.

Inflation rose from an annual rate of 32% in 1998, to an estimated high of 11,200,000% in August 2008 according to the Central Statistical Office. This represented a state of hyperinflation, and the central bank introduced a new 100 trillion dollar note. In January 2009, in an effort to counteract runaway inflation, acting Finance Minister Patrick Chinamasa announced that Zimbabweans would be permitted to use other, more stable currencies to do business, alongside the Zimbabwean dollar. In an effort to combat inflation and foster economic growth, the Zimbabwean dollar was suspended indefinitely in April 2009. In 2016, Zimbabwe allowed trade in the United States dollar and various other currencies such as the rand (South Africa), the pula (Botswana), the euro, and the pound sterling (UK). In February 2019, Reserve Bank of Zimbabwe Governor John Mangudya introduced a new local currency, the Real Time Gross Settlement dollar, in a move to address some of the Zimbabwean economic and financial challenges.

After the formation of the Unity Government and the adoption of several currencies instead of the Zimbabwe dollar in 2009, the Zimbabwean economy rebounded. GDP grew by 8–9% per year between 2009 and 2012. In November 2010, the International Monetary Fund described the Zimbabwean economy as "completing its second year of buoyant economic growth". The pan-African investment bank IMARA released a favourable report in February 2011 on investment prospects in Zimbabwe, citing an improved revenue base and higher tax receipts. In January 2013, the finance ministry reported that they had only $217 in their treasury and would apply for donations to finance the coming elections. By 2014, Zimbabwe had recovered to levels seen in the 1990s but growth faltered between 2012 and 2016. Inflation was 42% in 2018; in June 2019, the inflation rate reached 175%, leading to mass unrest across the country.

Minerals 
The mining sector is lucrative, with some of the world's largest platinum reserves being mined by Anglo American plc, Zimplats, and Impala Platinum. Zimplats, the nation's largest platinum company, has proceeded with US$500 million in expansions, and is also continuing a separate US$2 billion project, despite threats by Mugabe to nationalise the company.

The Marange diamond fields, discovered in 2006, are considered the biggest diamond find in over a century. They have the potential to improve the fiscal situation of the country considerably, but almost all revenues from the field have disappeared into the pockets of army officers and ZANU–PF politicians. In terms of carats produced, the Marange field is one of the largest diamond-producing projects in the world, estimated to have produced 12 million carats in 2014 worth over $350 million.

, Metallon Corporation was Zimbabwe's largest gold miner.

Agriculture
Zimbabwe's commercial farming sector was traditionally a source of exports and foreign exchange and provided 400,000 jobs. However, the government's land reform program badly damaged the sector, turning Zimbabwe into a net importer of food products. For example, between 2000 and 2016, annual wheat production fell from 250,000 tons to 60,000 tons, maize was reduced from two million tons to 500,000 tons and cattle slaughtered for beef fell from 605,000 head to 244,000 head. Coffee production, once a prized export commodity, came to a virtual halt after seizure or expropriation of white-owned coffee farms in 2000 and has never recovered.

For the past ten years, the International Crops Research Institute for the Semi-Arid Tropics has been assisting Zimbabwe's farmers to adopt conservation agriculture techniques, a sustainable method of farming that can help increase yields. By applying the three principles of minimum soil disturbance, legume-based cropping and the use of organic mulch, farmers can improve infiltration, reduce evaporation and soil erosion, and build up organic soil content. Between 2005 and 2011, the number of smallholders practicing conservation agriculture in Zimbabwe increased from 5,000 to more than 150,000. Cereal yields rose between 15 and 100 per cent across different regions. The government declared potato a national strategic food security crop in 2012.

Mvurwi, a region in Mashonaland Central Province, once fell in the "breadbasket region" of Zimbabwe, with fertile soils.  However, over the past 30 years, this is one of the areas that have been negatively impacted by the land reforms, causing it to be less prosperous than it was in the late 20th century.

Tourism

Since the land reform programme in 2000, tourism in Zimbabwe has steadily declined. In 2018, tourism peaked with 2.6 million tourists. In 2016, the total contribution of tourism to Zimbabwe was $1.1 billion (USD), or about 8.1% of Zimbabwe's GDP. Employment in travel and tourism, as well as industries travel and tourism indirectly supports, was 5.2% of national employment.

Several airlines pulled out of Zimbabwe between 2000 and 2007. Australia's Qantas, Germany's Lufthansa, and Austrian Airlines were among the first to pull out and in 2007 British Airways suspended all direct flights to Harare. The country's flagship airline Air Zimbabwe, which operated flights throughout Africa and a few destinations in Europe and Asia, ceased operations in February 2012. As of 2017, several major commercial airlines had resumed flights to Zimbabwe.

Zimbabwe has several major tourist attractions. Victoria Falls on the Zambezi, which are shared with Zambia, are located in the north-west of Zimbabwe. Before the economic changes, much of the tourism for these locations came to the Zimbabwe side, but now Zambia is the main beneficiary. The Victoria Falls National Park is also in this area and is one of the eight main national parks in Zimbabwe, the largest of which is Hwange National Park.

The Eastern Highlands are a series of mountainous areas near the border with Mozambique.

Zimbabwe is unusual in Africa in that there are a number of ancient and medieval ruined cities built in a unique dry stone style. Among the most famous of these are the Great Zimbabwe ruins in Masvingo. Other ruins include Khami Ruins, Zimbabwe, Dhlo-Dhlo and Naletale. The hills were formed over two billion years ago with granite being forced to the surface, then being eroded to produce smooth "whaleback dwalas" and broken kopjes, strewn with boulders and interspersed with thickets of vegetation. Mzilikazi, founder of the Ndebele nation, gave the area its name, meaning 'Bald Heads'. They have become a tourist attraction because of their ancient shapes and local wildlife. Cecil Rhodes and other early white colonists like Leander Starr Jameson are buried in these hills at World's View.

Water supply and sanitation

There are many small-scale successful water supply and sanitation programs, but there is also a general lack of improved water and sanitation systems for the majority of Zimbabwe. According to the World Health Organization in 2012, 80% of Zimbabweans had access to improved, i.e. clean, drinking water sources, and only 40% of Zimbabweans had access to improved sanitation facilities. Access to improved water supply and sanitation is distinctly less in rural areas. There are many factors which continue to determine the nature, for the foreseeable future of water supply and sanitation in Zimbabwe. Three major factors are the severely depressed state of the Zimbabwean economy, the reluctance of foreign aid organisations to build and finance infrastructure projects, and the political instability of the state.

Science and technology 

Zimbabwe has relatively well-developed national infrastructure and a long-standing tradition of promoting research and development, as evidenced by the levy imposed on tobacco-growers since the 1930s to promote market research. The country has a well-developed education system, with one in 11 adults holding a tertiary degree. Given the country's solid knowledge base and abundant natural resources, Zimbabwe has great growth potential. Zimbabwe was ranked 113rd in the Global Innovation Index in 2021, up from 122nd in 2019.

To achieve its growth potential, Zimbabwe will need to correct a number of structural weaknesses. For instance, it lacks the critical mass of researchers needed to trigger innovation. Although the infrastructure is in place to harness research and development to Zimbabwe's socio-economic development, universities and research institutions lack the financial and human resources to conduct research and the regulatory environment hampers the transfer of new technologies to the business sector. The economic crisis has precipitated an exodus of university students and professionals in key areas of expertise (medicine, engineering, etc.) that is of growing concern. More than 22% of Zimbabwean tertiary students were completing their degrees abroad in 2012, compared to a 4% average for sub-Saharan Africa as a whole. In 2012, there were 200 researchers (head count) employed in the public sector, one-quarter of whom were women. This is double the continental average (91 in 2013) but only one-quarter the researcher density of South Africa (818 per million inhabitants). The government has created the Zimbabwe Human Capital Website to provide information for the diaspora on job and investment opportunities in Zimbabwe.

Despite the fact that human resources are a pillar of any research and innovation policy, the Medium Term Plan 2011–2015 did not discuss any explicit policy for promoting postgraduate studies in science and engineering. The scarcity of new PhDs in science and engineering fields from the University of Zimbabwe in 2013 was symptomatic of this omission.

Nor does the development agenda to 2018, the Zimbabwe Agenda for Sustainable Economic Transformation, contain any specific targets for increasing the number of scientists and engineers, or the staffing requirements for industry and other productive sectors. In addition, the lack of co-ordination and coherence among governance structures has led to a multiplication of research priorities and poor implementation of existing policies.

The country's Second Science and Technology Policy was launched in June 2012, after being elaborated with UNESCO assistance. It replaces the earlier policy dating from 2002. The 2012 policy prioritises biotechnology, information and communication technologies (ICTs), space sciences, nanotechnology, indigenous knowledge systems, technologies yet to emerge and scientific solutions to emergent environmental challenges. The Second Science and Technology Policy also asserts the government commitment to allocating at least 1% of GDP to research and development, focusing at least 60% of university education on developing skills in science and technology and ensuring that school pupils devote at least 30% of their time to studying science subjects.

In 2014, Zimbabwe counted 21 publications per million inhabitants in internationally catalogued journals, according to Thomson Reuters' Web of Science (Science Citation Index Expanded). This placed Zimbabwe sixth out of the 15 SADC countries, behind Namibia (59), Mauritius (71), Botswana (103) and, above all, South Africa (175) and the Seychelles (364). The average for sub-Saharan Africa was 20 scientific publications per million inhabitants, compared to a global average of 176 per million.

Demographics

Ethnic groups

According to the 2012 census report, 99.7% of the population is of African origin. The majority people, the Shona, comprise 82%, while Ndebele make up 14% of the population. The Ndebele descended from Zulu migrations in the 19th century and the other tribes with which they intermarried. Up to one million Ndebele may have left the country over the last five years, mainly for South Africa. Other ethnic groups include Venda, Tonga, Tsonga, Kalanga, Sotho, Ndau, Nambya, Tswana, Xhosa and Lozi.

Minority ethnic groups include white Zimbabweans, who make up less than 1% of the total population. White Zimbabweans are mostly of British origin, but there are also Afrikaner, Greek, Portuguese, French and Dutch communities. The white population dropped from a peak of around 278,000, or 4.3% of the population, in 1975. The 2012 census lists the total white population at 28,782 (roughly 0.22% of the population), one-twentieth of its peak. Most emigration has been to the United Kingdom (between 200,000 and 500,000 Britons are of Rhodesian or Zimbabwean origin), South Africa, Botswana, Zambia, Mozambique, Canada, Australia and New Zealand. Coloureds form 0.5% of the population, and various Asian ethnic groups, mostly of Indian and Chinese origin, are also 0.5%.

Largest cities

Languages

Zimbabwe has 16 official languages and under the constitution, an Act of Parliament may prescribe other languages as officially recognised languages. English is the main language used in the education and judicial systems. The Bantu languages Shona and Ndebele are the principal indigenous languages of Zimbabwe. Shona is spoken by 78% of the population, Ndebele by 20%. Other minority Bantu languages include Venda, Tsonga, Shangaan, Kalanga, Sotho, Ndau and Nambya. Less than 2.5%, mainly the white and "coloured" (mixed race) minorities, consider English their native language. Shona has a rich oral tradition, which was incorporated into the first Shona novel, Feso by Solomon Mutswairo, published in 1956. English is primarily spoken in the cities but less so in rural areas. Radio and television news are broadcast in Shona, Sindebele and English.

There is a large community of Portuguese speakers in Zimbabwe, mainly in the border areas with Mozambique and in major cities. Beginning in 2017, teaching Portuguese was included in secondary education of Zimbabwe.

Religion

According to the 2017 Inter Censal Demography Survey by the Zimbabwe National Statistics Agency, 84% of Zimbabweans are Christian; 10% of the population do not belong to any religion, and 0.7% are Muslim.

62% of the population attend religious services regularly. 69% of Zimbabweans belong to Protestant Christianity, 8% are Roman Catholic. Pentecostal-charismatic forms of Christianity, in particular, have grown rapidly in recent years and are playing a prominent role in public, social and political life. The largest Christian churches are Anglican, Roman Catholic, Seventh-day Adventist and Methodist.

As in other African countries, Christianity may be mixed with enduring traditional beliefs. Indigenous religion, which predates colonialism, has become relatively marginal but continues to be an important part of the Zimbabwean religious field. Ancestral worship is the most practised non-Christian religion, involving spiritual intercession; the mbira dzavadzimu, which means "voice of the ancestors", an instrument related to many lamellophones ubiquitous throughout Africa, is central to many ceremonial proceedings.

Health

At independence, the policies of racial inequality were reflected in the disease patterns of the black majority. The first five years after independence saw rapid gains in areas such as immunisation coverage, access to health care, and contraceptive prevalence rate. Zimbabwe was thus considered internationally to have achieved a good record of health development.

Zimbabwe suffered occasional outbreaks of acute diseases. The gains on the national health were eroded by structural adjustment in the 1990s, the impact of the HIV/AIDS pandemic and the economic crisis since 2000. In 2006, Zimbabwe had one of the lowest life expectancies in the world according to UN figure—44 for men and 43 for women, down from 60 in 1990, but recovered to 60 in 2015. The rapid drop was ascribed mainly to the HIV/AIDS pandemic. Infant mortality rose from 6% in the late 1990s to 12.3% by 2004. Official fertility rates over the last decade were 3.6 (2002), 3.8 (2006) and 3.8 (2012). The 2014 maternal mortality rate per 100,000 births for Zimbabwe was 614 compared to 960 in 2010–11 and 232 in 1990. The under five mortality rate, per 1,000 births was 75 in 2014 (94 in 2009). The number of midwives per 1,000 live births was unavailable in 2016 and the lifetime risk of death for pregnant women 1 in 42.

In 2006 an association of doctors in Zimbabwe made calls for Mugabe to make moves to assist the ailing health service. The HIV infection rate in Zimbabwe was estimated to be 14% for people aged 15–49 in 2009. UNESCO reported a decline in HIV prevalence among pregnant women from 26% in 2002 to 21% in 2004. By 2016 HIV/AIDS prevalence had been reduced to 13.5% compared to 40% in 1998.

At the end of November 2008, some operations at three of Zimbabwe's four major referral hospitals had shut down, along with the Zimbabwe Medical School, and the fourth major hospital had two wards and no operating theatres working. Those hospitals still open were not able to obtain basic drugs and medicines. The situation changed drastically after the Unity Government and the introduction of the multi-currency system in February 2009 although the political and economic crisis also contributed to the emigration of the doctors and people with medical knowledge.

In August 2008 large areas of Zimbabwe were struck by the ongoing cholera epidemic. By December 2008 more than 10,000 people had been infected in all but one of Zimbabwe's provinces, and the outbreak had spread to Botswana, Mozambique, South Africa and Zambia. On 4 December 2008 the Zimbabwe government declared the outbreak to be a national emergency and asked for international aid. By 9 March 2009 The World Health Organization estimated that 4,011 people had succumbed to the waterborne disease since the outbreak began, and the total number of cases recorded had reached 89,018. In Harare, the city council offered free graves to cholera victims.

Education

Large investments in education since independence has resulted in the highest adult literacy rate in Africa which in 2013 was 90.70%. This is lower than the 92% recorded in 2010 by the United Nations Development Programme and the 97.0% recorded in the 2002 census, while still substantially higher than 80.4% recorded in the 1992 census.

The wealthier portion of the population usually send their children to independent schools as opposed to the government-run schools which are attended by the majority as these are subsidised by the government. School education was made free in 1980, but since 1988, the government has steadily increased the charges attached to school enrolment until they now greatly exceed the real value of fees in 1980. The Ministry of Education of Zimbabwe maintains and operates the government schools, but the fees charged by independent schools are regulated by the cabinet of Zimbabwe. The education department has stated that 20,000 teachers have left Zimbabwe since 2007 and that half of Zimbabwe's children have not progressed beyond primary school. Education came under threat since the economic changes in 2000, with teachers going on strike because of low pay, students unable to concentrate because of hunger, and the price of uniforms soaring making this standard a luxury. Teachers were also one of the main targets of Mugabe's attacks because he thought they were not strong supporters.

Zimbabwe's education system consists of two years of pre-school, seven years of primary and six years of secondary schooling before students can enter university in the country or abroad. The academic year in Zimbabwe runs from January to December, with three terms, separated by one-month breaks, with a total of 40 weeks of school per year. National examinations are written during the third term in November, with "O" level and "A" level subjects also offered in June.

There are seven public (government) universities as well as four church-related universities in Zimbabwe that are internationally accredited. The University of Zimbabwe, the first and largest, was built in 1952 and is located in the Harare suburb of Mount Pleasant. Notable alumni from Zimbabwean universities include Welshman Ncube, Peter Moyo, Tendai Biti, Chenjerai Hove and Arthur Mutambara. Many of the politicians in the government of Zimbabwe have obtained degrees from universities in the United States or other universities abroad.

National University of Science and Technology is the second largest public research university in Zimbabwe located in Bulawayo. It was established in 1991. The National University of Science and Technology strives to become a flourishing and reputable institution not only in Zimbabwe and in Southern Africa but also among the international fraternity of universities. Africa University is a United Methodist university in Manicaland which attracts students from at least 36 African countries.

Gender equality 

Women in Zimbabwe are disadvantaged in many facets including economic, political, and social spheres, and experience sex and gender based violence. A 2014 UN report found that deep rooted cultural issues, patriarchal attitudes, and religious practices negatively impacted women's rights and freedoms in the country. These negative views toward women as well as societal norms impact the incentive for women to participate in the economy and hinder their economic production. Zimbabwe's constitution has provisions in it that provide incentive to achieve greater gender equality, but the data shows that enforcement has been lax and adoption slow. In December 2016 the International Federation of Red Cross and Red Crescent Societies conducted a case study to determine how to best implement effective policy to address issues such as gender violence and implementation of equality laws. It was found that sex and gender based violence against women and girls was increasing in areas that had experienced disasters (floods, drought, disease) but could not quantify the extent of the increase. Some of the obstacles in combating these issues are that there are economic barriers to declaring sex and gender based violence to be unacceptable as well as social barriers. Additionally, governmental services which were installed to help educate the populace about these issues as well as provide services to victims are underfunded and unable to carry out their duties. The UN also provided economic incentive to adopt policies which would discourage these practices which negatively impacted women in Zimbabwe.

Women are often seen as inferior, treated as objects, and viewed in subordinate roles in history and philosophy. Ubuntu, an African philosophy's spiritual aspect, instills the belief that boys should be more valued than girls as boys pass on lineage, and the belief system places high value in respecting one's ancestors. A common expression used in court, "vakadzi ngavanyarare", translates to "women should keep quiet," and as a result women are not consulted in decision-making; they must implement the men's wishes. The subordination of women in Zimbabwe, and the cultural forces which dictate what they must be, have led to deaths and the sacrifice of professional advancement in order for them to fulfill their roles as wives, mothers, and subordinates. Women are taught that they must never refuse their husband's sexual advances, even if they know they are infected with HIV from being unfaithful. As a result of this practice, Zimbabwean women aged 15–49 have an HIV prevalence rate of 16.1% and make up 62% of the total population infected with HIV in that age group.

Zimbabwean women face cultural and social adversity in their professional lives which affects their educational attainment, professional development, and advancement. In 2009 the South African Journal of Education found that although the majority of primary school teachers in their random sample size were qualified for advancement to administrative positions, none of them had applied for administrative openings. The women did not see themselves as equals with their male counterparts and believed their role as a wife and mother superseded all other parts of their lives. The women surveyed in this trial were also found to have low self-esteem, a possible correlation to their societal roles and gender stereotypes. In 2016 the FAO found that only 60% of women participated in the economy in some form compared to 74.3% for their male counterparts. Women also made up the majority of low education jobs, such as 70% of the agriculture work force, yet only made up 16.7% and 21% of local authority and managers in the private sector respectively. In the public sector, women comprised 14% of the Zimbabwean House of Assembly and 33% of the Senate, despite the population ratio being 0.95 males per 1 female. To address gender inequality in the economy, the UN supports policies which help increase the number of women in leadership roles, such as heads of schools, with increased funding in line with #3 of the outlined Millennium Development Goals. Through these policies Zimbabwe has made gains in closing the gender gap in school enrolment: 50.5% of males are enrolled in secondary schools compared to 49.5% in females.

Zimbabwe experiences high rates of domestic and sexual violence; the Zimbabwe National Statistics Office shows that rates are increasing. 21 rapes are reported per day in Zimbabwe - a rate of 0.12 rapes per day per 100,000 people. As not all rapes are reported, the actual number is likely higher. Reported rape increased 42% between 2010 and 2016. Of all the violence against girls and women reported in Zimbabwe, 78% was inflicted by their spouse, father, or domestic partner. UNICEF reports show that one in three girls that grow up in Zimbabwe experience sexual assault before turning 18; this is further exacerbated by cultural norms such as child marriage. Young girls often run away with older men when their educational opportunities are limited or to escape a violent household. These incidents of domestic violence or young girls running away with older men are usually not investigated by police as men are viewed as superior to women in Zimbabwean culture and their role as the dominant person in the relationship is to discipline their spouse, often violently. There is an ingrained cultural norm that violence can be a show of power and love which makes ending domestic abuse in Zimbabwe difficult. The Zimbabwe Women's Lawyers Association is an organisation that is assisting the implementation of the legal framework, as defined in the 2013 constitution, to help women. The association provides programmes which help educate women on their rights and provides them with opportunities as a way of combating domestic and sexual violence.

Culture

Zimbabwe has many different cultures, with Shona beliefs and ceremonies being prominent. The Shona people have many types of sculptures and carvings.

Zimbabwe first celebrated its independence on 18 April 1980. Celebrations are held at either the National Sports Stadium or Rufaro Stadium in Harare. The first independence celebrations were held in 1980 at the Zimbabwe Grounds. At these celebrations, doves are released to symbolise peace, fighter jets fly over, and the national anthem is sung. The flame of independence is lit by the president after parades by the presidential family and members of the armed forces of Zimbabwe. The president also gives a speech to the people of Zimbabwe which is televised for those unable to attend the stadium. Zimbabwe also has a national beauty pageant, the Miss Heritage Zimbabwe contest, which has been held annually since 2012.

Arts

Traditional arts in Zimbabwe include pottery, basketry, textiles, jewellery and carving. Among the distinctive qualities are symmetrically patterned woven baskets and stools carved out of a single piece of wood. Shona sculpture, which has a long cultural history, began evolving into its modern form in the mid 20th century and gained increasing international popularity. Most subjects of carved figures of stylised birds and human figures among others are made with sedimentary rock such as soapstone, as well as harder igneous rocks such as serpentine and the rare stone verdite. Zimbabwean artefacts can be found in countries like Singapore, China and Canada. e.g. Dominic Benhura's statue in the Singapore Botanic Gardens.

Shona sculpture has survived through the ages, and the modern style is a fusion of African folklore with European influences. World-renowned Zimbabwean sculptors include Nicholas, Nesbert and Anderson Mukomberanwa, Tapfuma Gutsa, Henry Munyaradzi and Locardia Ndandarika. Internationally, Zimbabwean sculptors have managed to influence a new generation of artists, particularly black Americans, through lengthy apprenticeships with master sculptors in Zimbabwe. 

Several authors are well known within Zimbabwe and abroad. Charles Mungoshi is renowned in Zimbabwe for writing traditional stories in English and in Shona, and his poems and books have sold well with both the black and white communities. Catherine Buckle has achieved international recognition with her two books African Tears and Beyond Tears which tell of the ordeal she went through under the 2000 Land Reform. The first Prime Minister of Rhodesia, Ian Smith, wrote two books – The Great Betrayal and Bitter Harvest. The book The House of Hunger by Dambudzo Marechera won an award in the UK in 1979 and the Nobel Prize-winning author Doris Lessing's first novel The Grass Is Singing, the first four volumes of Children of Violence sequence, as well as the collection of short stories African Stories are set in Rhodesia. In 2013 NoViolet Bulawayo's novel We Need New Names was shortlisted for the Booker Prize. The novel tells the story of the devastation and emigration caused by the brutal suppression of Zimbabwean civilians during the Gukurahundi in the early 1980s.

Notable artists include Henry Mudzengerere and Nicolas Mukomberanwa. A recurring theme in Zimbabwean art is the metamorphosis of man into beast. Zimbabwean musicians like Thomas Mapfumo, Oliver Mtukudzi, the Bhundu Boys; Stella Chiweshe, Alick Macheso and Audius Mtawarira have achieved international recognition. Among members of the white minority community, Theatre has a large following, with numerous theatrical companies performing in Zimbabwe's urban areas.

Cuisine

Like in many African countries, the majority of Zimbabweans depend on a few staple foods. "Mealie meal", also known as cornmeal, is used to prepare sadza or isitshwala, as well as porridge known as bota or ilambazi. Sadza is made by mixing the cornmeal with water to produce a thick paste/porridge. After the paste has been cooking for several minutes, more cornmeal is added to thicken the paste. This is usually eaten as lunch or dinner, usually with sides such as gravy, vegetables (spinach, chomolia, or spring greens/collard greens), beans, and meat (stewed, grilled, roasted, or sundried). Sadza is also commonly eaten with curdled milk (sour milk), commonly known as "lacto" (mukaka wakakora), or dried Tanganyika sardine, known locally as kapenta or matemba. Bota is a thinner porridge, cooked without the additional cornmeal and usually flavoured with peanut butter, milk, butter, or jam. Bota is usually eaten for breakfast.

Graduations, weddings, and any other family gatherings will usually be celebrated with the killing of a goat or cow, which will be barbecued or roasted by the family.

Even though the Afrikaners are a small group (10%) within the white minority group, Afrikaner recipes are popular. Biltong, a type of jerky, is a popular snack, prepared by hanging bits of spiced raw meat to dry in the shade. Boerewors is served with sadza. It is a long sausage, often well-spiced, composed of beef rather than pork, and barbecued.

As Zimbabwe was a British colony, some people there have adopted some colonial-era English eating habits. For example, most people will have porridge in the morning, as well as 10 o'clock tea (midday tea). They will have lunch, often leftovers from the night before, freshly cooked sadza, or sandwiches (which is more common in the cities). After lunch, there is usually 4 o'clock tea (afternoon tea), which is served before dinner. It is not uncommon for tea to be had after dinner.

Rice, pasta, and potato-based foods (French fries and mashed potato) also make up part of Zimbabwean cuisine. A local favourite is rice cooked with peanut butter, which is taken with thick gravy, mixed vegetables and meat. A potpourri of peanuts known as nzungu, boiled and sundried maize, black-eyed peas known as nyemba, and Bambara groundnuts known as nyimo makes a traditional dish called mutakura. Mutakura can also be the above ingredients cooked individually.

Sports 

Football (also known as soccer) is the most popular sport in Zimbabwe. The Warriors have qualified for the Africa Cup of Nations five times (2004, 2006, 2017, 2019, 2021), and won the Southern Africa championship on six occasions (2000, 2003, 2005, 2009, 2017, 2018) and the Eastern Africa cup once (1985). The team is ranked 68th in 2022. Rugby union is a significant sport in Zimbabwe. The national side have represented the country at 2 Rugby World Cup tournaments in 1987 and 1991. Cricket also has a following among the white minority. It is one of twelve Test cricket playing nations and an ICC full member as well. Notable cricket players from Zimbabwe include Andy Flower, Heath Streak and Brendan Taylor.

Zimbabwe has won eight Olympic medals, one in field hockey with the women's team at the 1980 Summer Olympics in Moscow, and seven by swimmer Kirsty Coventry, three at the 2004 Summer Olympics and four at the 2008 Summer Olympics. Zimbabwe has done well in the Commonwealth Games and All-Africa Games in swimming with Coventry obtaining 11 gold medals in the different competitions. Zimbabwe has competed at Wimbledon and the Davis Cup in tennis, most notably with the Black family, which comprises Wayne Black, Byron Black and Cara Black. The Zimbabwean Nick Price held the official World Number 1 golf status longer than any player from Africa has done.

Other sports played in Zimbabwe are basketball, volleyball, netball, and water polo, as well as squash, motorsport, martial arts, chess, cycling, polocrosse, kayaking and horse racing. However, most of these sports do not have international representatives but instead stay at a junior or national level.

Zimbabwean professional rugby league players playing overseas are Masimbaashe Motongo and Judah Mazive. Former players include now SANZAAR CEO Andy Marinos who made an appearance for South Africa at the Super League World Nines and featured for the Sydney Bulldogs as well as Zimbabwe-born former Scotland rugby union international Scott Gray, who spent time at the Brisbane Broncos.

Zimbabwe has had success in karate as Zimbabwe's Samson Muripo became Kyokushin world champion in Osaka, Japan in 2009. Muripo is a two-time World Kyokushi Karate Champion and was the first black African to become the World Kyokushin Karate Champion.

Media
The media of Zimbabwe is now once again diverse, having come under tight restriction between 2002 and 2008 by the government during the economic and political crisis. The Zimbabwean constitution promises freedom of the media and expression. Since the appointment of a new media and information minister in 2013 the media is facing less political interference and the supreme court has ruled some sections of the strict media laws as unconstitutional. In July 2009 the BBC and CNN were able to resume operations and report legally and openly from Zimbabwe. The Zimbabwe Ministry of Media, Information and Publicity stated that, "the Zimbabwe government never banned the BBC from carrying out lawful activities inside Zimbabwe". The BBC welcomed the move saying, "we're pleased at being able to operate openly in Zimbabwe once again".

In 2010 the Zimbabwe Media Commission was established by the inclusive, power-sharing government. In May 2010 the commission licensed three privately owned newspapers, including the previously banned Daily News, for publication. Reporters Without Borders described the decisions as a "major advance". In June 2010 NewsDay became the first independent daily newspaper to be published in Zimbabwe in seven years. ZBC's monopoly in the broadcasting sector was ended with the licensing of two private radio stations in 2012.

Since the 2002 Access to Information and Protection of Privacy Act was passed, a number of privately owned news outlets were shut down by the government, including Daily News whose managing director Wilf Mbanga went on to form the influential The Zimbabwean. As a result, many press organisations have been set up in both neighbouring and Western countries by exiled Zimbabweans. Because the internet is unrestricted, many Zimbabweans are allowed to access online news sites set up by exiled journalists. Reporters Without Borders claims the media environment in Zimbabwe involves "surveillance, threats, imprisonment, censorship, blackmail, abuse of power and denial of justice are all brought to bear to keep firm control over the news." The main published newspapers are The Herald and The Chronicle which are printed in Harare and Bulawayo respectively. The heavy-handedness on the media has progressively relaxed since 2009.

In its 2021 report, Reporters Without Borders ranked the Zimbabwean media as 130th out of 180, noting that "access to information has improved and self-censorship has declined, but journalists are still often attacked or arrested". The government also bans many foreign broadcasting stations from Zimbabwe, including the CBC, Sky News, Channel 4, American Broadcasting Company, Australian Broadcasting Corporation, and Fox News. News agencies and newspapers from other Western countries and South Africa have also been banned from the country.

National symbols

The stone-carved Zimbabwe Bird appears on the national flags and the coats of arms of both Zimbabwe and Rhodesia, as well as on banknotes and coins (first on Rhodesian pound and then Rhodesian dollar). It probably represents the bateleur eagle or the African fish eagle. The famous soapstone bird carvings stood on walls and monoliths of the ancient city of Great Zimbabwe.

Balancing rocks are geological formations all over Zimbabwe. The rocks are perfectly balanced without other supports. They are created when ancient granite intrusions are exposed to weathering, as softer rocks surrounding them erode away. They are often remarked on and have been depicted on both the banknotes of Zimbabwe and the Rhodesian dollar banknotes. There are many different formations of the rocks, incorporating single and paired columns of three or more rocks. These formations are a feature of south and east tropical Africa from northern South Africa northwards to Sudan. The most notable formations in Zimbabwe are located in the Matobo National Park in Matabeleland.

The national anthem of Zimbabwe is "Blessed be the Land of Zimbabwe". It was introduced in March 1994 after a nationwide competition to replace  as a distinctly Zimbabwean song. The winning entry was a song written by Professor Solomon Mutswairo and composed by Fred Changundega. It has been translated into all three of the main languages of Zimbabwe.

See also 

 Index of Zimbabwe-related articles
 Outline of Zimbabwe

References

Citations

Sources

Further reading 
 
 .
 Bourne, Richard. Catastrophe: What Went Wrong in Zimbabwe? (2011); 302 pages.
 , 286 pages. Scholarly essays on displacement as a result of Zimbabwe's continuing crisis, with a focus on diasporic communities in Britain and South Africa; also explores such topics as the revival of Rhodesian discourse.
 Meredith, Martin. Mugabe: Power, Plunder, and the Struggle for Zimbabwe's Future (2007) excerpt and text search.
 .
 Smith, Ian Douglas. Bitter Harvest: Zimbabwe and the Aftermath of its Independence (2008) excerpt and text search.
 David Coltart. The struggle continues: 50 Years of Tyranny in Zimbabwe. Jacana Media (Pty) Ltd: South Africa, 2016.

External links 

 Official Government of Zimbabwe Web Portal 
 Parliament of Zimbabwe
 
 Zimbabwe profile from the BBC News
 
 Zimbabwe. The World Factbook. Central Intelligence Agency.
 Zimbabwe from UCB Libraries GovPubs
 Key Development Forecasts for Zimbabwe from International Futures
 World Bank Summary Trade Statistics Zimbabwe

 
1980 establishments in Zimbabwe
English-speaking countries and territories
Former British colonies and protectorates in Africa
G15 nations
Landlocked countries
Member states of the African Union
Member states of the United Nations
Republics
East African countries
Southeast African countries
Southern African countries
States and territories established in 1980
Countries in Africa